Wendy Overton (born March 31, 1947) is an American former professional tennis player active in the 1970s. She is known mostly for her performance in doubles.

She began her tennis career in Florida at the age of 11. She was ranked world No. 1 in juniors and won several US National titles in both singles and doubles.

She attended Rollins College in Winter Park, Florida on an academic scholarship and was a top-ranked collegiate player from 1965 to 1969.

She participated in World TeamTennis and played for Toronto, Cleveland, and Indiana.

An arm injury ended her career.

After her retirement, she became tennis director of the Hunters Run Golf and Racket Club in Boynton Beach, Florida, a post she held for 10 years. She then became a real estate agent. She won the US Open senior event in 1997.

WTA Tour finals

Doubles 9 (5 titles, 4 runner-ups)

External links
 
 

1947 births
American female tennis players
Living people
Sportspeople from Boynton Beach, Florida
Tennis people from Florida
Sportspeople from Glen Cove, New York
21st-century American women